Genoa Joint Laboratories (GJL) is a scientific research activity founded in 2002, combining expertise in electroceramics and electrochemistry of three facilities: National Research Council - Institute for Energetics and Interphases (CNR-IENI), Department of Chemical and Process Engineering with University of Genova (DICHeP), and the Department of Chemistry and Industrial Chemistry with University of Genova (DCCI), all located in Genoa, Italy.

Research focus
The focus of GJL's research is across four fundamental factors that are critical to production and implementation of High-Temperature Solid Oxide Fuel Cells:
 Synthesis and sintering of electrolytes
 Cell design, testing and analysis
 Electrocatalysis
 Interconnects
Bridging these four factors, GJL is engaged in research in six interdependent fields:
 Synthesis of cathode and anode materials for IT-SOFCs
 Synthesis of protonic electrolyte for IT/LT-SOFCs
 Production of engineered electrodes
 Electrochemical kinetics at the anode and cathode for SOFCs and MCFCs
 Study of metallic interconnect behaviour
 Model the distribution of active sites in composite electrodes
Using Electrochemical Impedance Spectroscopy, it has been found that the rate determining step of the oxygen reduction reaction changes between 700 and 800 °C. This is important because it proves the existence of a critical temperature, previously only theorised, for activation of the entire composite cathode volume close to 750 °C. Below this temperature, ionic transport is slower; as the temperature increases, so does ionic activity through the cathode. Additionally, GJL researchers have demonstrated that the volume ratio between Lanthanum Strontium Manganite (LSM) and Yttria Stabilised Zirconia (YSZ) composite cathodes which is close to 1:1 gives the best electrochemical activity because of the extension of the three phase boundary (TPB) in the electrode. By means of impedance analysis and potentiodynamic polarisation, this finding has strong implications for optimal SOFC design.

Affiliated research facilities
 National Research Council - Institute for Energetics and Interphases (CNR-IENI) 
(Italian: Consiglio Nazionale delle Ricerche, Istituto per l'Energetica e le Interfasi)
 Department of Chemical and Process Engineering – University of Genova (DICHeP) (Italian: Dipartimento di Ingegneria Chimica e di Processo)
The principal element within DICHeP participating is the Electrochemistry Lab .
 Department of Chemistry and Industrial Chemistry – University of Genova (DCCI) 
(Italian: Dipartimento di Chimica e Chimica Industriale)

References

 Italian National Research Council  
 University of Genoa 
 University of Genoa, Department of Chemical and Process Engineering 
 University of Genoa, Department of Chemistry and Industrial Chemistry 
 CNR Institute for Energetics and Interphases 
 Genoa Joint Laboratories 
 European Science Foundation Exploratory Workshop "Proton Conducting Materials for Next-Generation Solid Oxide Fuel Cells

External links
 "Activities of the 'Genoa Joint Laboratories on High Temperature Fuel Cells'." ESF/PESC Exploratory Workshop.

Research institutes in Italy